AAF may refer to:

Aviation
 Aigle Azur (ICAO code), a French airline
 Apalachicola Regional Airport (IATA code), in Apalachicola, Florida

Corporations
 American Air Filter, today a part of HVAC-equipment-maker Daikin

Military
 Albanian Armed Forces
 Algerian Air Force
 Afghan Air Force
 Afghan Armed Forces
 Army Air Field, an operating base for the United States Army Aviation Branch
 Auxiliary Air Force, the original name of the Royal Auxiliary Air Force of the United Kingdom
 United States Army Air Forces, the precursor to the U.S. Air Force

Organizations
 Aboriginal-Australian Fellowship, a Sydney-based Indigenous rights organisation, 1956−1969
 Alliance of American Football, a defunct 2019 United States professional American football league
 Amateur Athletic Foundation, the former name of the LA84 Foundation, a Los Angeles-based nonprofit
 American Advertising Federation, a U.S. trade association
 Animals Asia Foundation, a Hong Kong-based charity
 Association of Adventist Forums, the former name of Adventist Forums, a Seventh-day Adventist group

Technology
 Advanced Authoring Format, an industry standard for high-end exchange of video project data
 Anti-aliasing filter, a filter used to restrict the bandwidth of a signal

Other uses
 2-Acetylaminofluorene, a biochemical tool
 Alien Ant Farm, an alternative rock band
 All Aboard Florida, the Florida East Coast Industries subsidiary that developed Brightline, a passenger rail service in Florida
 Aranadan language, a Dravidian language of India
 "Advance Australia Fair", the national anthem of Australia

See also